An alchemist is a person versed in the art of alchemy.  Western alchemy flourished in Greco-Roman Egypt, the Islamic world during the Middle Ages, and then in Europe from the 13th to the 18th centuries. Indian alchemists and Chinese alchemists made contributions to Eastern varieties of the art. Alchemy is still practiced today by a few, and alchemist characters still appear in recent fictional works and video games.

Many alchemists are known from the thousands of surviving alchemical manuscripts and books. Some of their names are listed below. Due to the tradition of pseudepigraphy, the true author of some alchemical writings may differ from the name most often associated with that work. Some well-known historical figures such as Albertus Magnus and Aristotle are often incorrectly named amongst the alchemists as a result.

Legendary
Hermes Trismegistus
Ostanes, the Persian
Nicolas Flamel
Perenelle Flamel

Greco-Roman Egypt

India
 Kanada, sage and philosopher (6th century BC)
 Nagarjuna
 Yogi Vemana
 Siddhar Tamil sage and philosophers
 Nayanmars Tamil sage and philosophers
 Alvars Tamil sage and philosophers
 Vallalar, Tamil 18th Century sage and philosopher
 Arunagirinathar Tamil 15th Century sage and philosopher
 Agastiyar Tamil Sage
 Korakkar Tamil Sage
 Thirumoolar Tamil Sage
 Bogar Tamil Sage
 Kagapujandar Tamil Sage
 Vaalmiki Tamil Sage
 Pattinathar Tamil Sage
 Kalangi Nathar Tamil Sage
 Pathanjali Tamil Sage
 Avvaiyar Tamil Sage
 Naradhar

China
Liu Yiming
Wei Boyang
Zhang Guo the Elder (c. 600)

Arabic-Islamic world

Khalid ibn Yazid, "Calid" (died 704)
Jābir ibn Hayyān, "Geber" (died c. 806–816)
Dhul-Nun al-Misri (born 796)
Al-Kindi, "Alkindus" (801–873), a critic of alchemy
Al-Farabi, "Alfarabi" (870–950/951)
Muhammad ibn Zakarīya Rāzi, "Rhazes" (864–930)
Muhammed ibn Umail al-Tamimi, "Senior Zadith" (c. 900–960)
Abu Ali al-Husain ibn Abdallah ibn Sina, "Avicenna" (980–1037), a critic of alchemy, Father of modern Medicine
Al-Tughrai (1061–1121)
Artephius (c. 1150)

Europe

Revival and modern

Scholars of alchemy

In fiction

See also
List of alchemical substances
List of astrologers
List of occultists

Lists of people by activity
Alchemy in art and entertainment